Tamar-class lifeboats are all-weather lifeboats (ALBs) operated by the Royal National Lifeboat Institution (RNLI) around the coasts of Great Britain and Ireland. They have replaced the majority of the older Tyne ALBs. The prototype was built in 2000 and 27 production boats were constructed between 2006 and 2013.

The class name comes from the River Tamar in south west England which flows into the English Channel, where the hulls from SAR Composites were fitted-out by Babcock International Group.

History
Since 1982 the RNLI had deployed Tyne lifeboats at stations which launched their boats down slipways or needed to operate in shallow waters. The organisation desired to increase the speed and range of their operations so introduced faster  and  boats starting in 1994 at locations where they could be moored afloat. The RNLI then needed to produce a boat with similar capabilities but with protected propellers and other modifications that would allow it to be launched on a slipway.

Although nominally the replacement for the Tyne ALBs, only twenty-seven Tamars have been built (compared to forty Tynes). The remaining Tynes will be replaced by Shannon boats.

The prototype Tamar was built in 2000 and was used for trials until 2006. It was sold in December 2008 to Kent Police, becoming Princess Alexandra III, the force's permanent maritime vessel operating out of Sheerness. A few of the early boats suffered problems such as fuel leaking under the floor of the engine room around hydraulic lines. These boats were recalled and the problems rectified.

The 27th and last Tamar-class lifeboat, allocated to The Mumbles, was launched 12 March 2013 in Devonport Dockyard and after sea trials was handed over to the RNLI on 21 May 2013. Ten lifeboat stations keep Tamars moored afloat, 13 launch them down slipways, and the remaining four form a Relief Fleet to cover when boats are unavailable for service. Most of the slipway stations required entirely new boathouses and slipways to accommodate the Tamar, but at Cromer and Angle the existing fairly modern boathouses were adapted and at Sennen Cove the capacious old boathouse was able to be modified to take the new boat. Towards the end of Tamar production, the boathouse building programme fell behind boat delivery dates and the last four boats went on station moored afloat pending boathouse completion, which was not finally achieved until October 2016, when the new St. Davids boathouse was opened.

Description

The Tamar has a new design of crew workstation with seats that can move up and down  as the boat passes through rough seas at high speed, and a networked computerised Systems and Information Management System (SIMS) which allows the crew to monitor and control the boat entirely from within the wheelhouse. The coxswain and helmsman have seat-mounted throttles, trackerball and joystick controls of the rudder. Alternatively the boat may be monitored and controlled by two controls on the bridge: Dual throttle controls and joystick on the left; dual throttle, wheel and control-screen on the right. All aspects of the vessel may also be controlled from this position.

The lifeboat is completely water-tight allowing it to self-right with up to 60 people on board. The boat has the potential to carry a maximum of 120 passengers on board, but without self-righting capability. The Survivors Space has room for 10 sitting and 8 standing. The Survivors Space is accessed either through the Wheelhouse or the fore deck Emergency Escape Hatch.

Each Tamar carries a Y Class inflatable boat which can be deployed and recovered while at sea. There is a provision for a PWC (Personal Water Craft, more commonly known as a jetski) to be specified instead, should it prove more suitable.

All Tamar Class lifeboats have sea water sourced open loop heat pump systems on board to keep the crew comfortable in high or low temperature conditions.

Fleet

References

External links 

 RNLI Fleet:Tamar Class
 Ingenia Magazine: launching the Tamar, December 2007
 Tenby Lifeboat Station's Tamar (includes slipway launch video)